Raghib Ismail Allie-Brennan (born July 20, 1991) is an American politician and former political aide serving as a member of the Connecticut House of Representatives from the 2nd district.

Early life and education 
Allie-Brennan was born in Queens, New York City and raised in Bethel, Connecticut. His father immigrated to New York City from Guyana. After graduating from Bethel High School, he earned a Bachelor of Arts degree in international relations from Marymount Manhattan College.

Career 
After earning his bachelor's degree, Allie-Brennan worked in Washington, D.C. as a congressional advisor in the United States House of Representatives, specializing in energy and environmental issues, disaster relief, and civil rights legislation. He worked as a legislative aide and advisor to Alma Adams and as an intern for Cedric Richmond. He later returned to Bethel, Connecticut, where he became active in local government.

In the 2018 election, Allie-Brennan was elected to the Connecticut House of Representatives, representing Connecticut's 2nd assembly district. Allie-Brennan succeeded one-term Republican incumbent Will Duff in a rematch after narrowly losing to Duff in the race for the open seat vacated by retiring Republican incumbent Dan Carter.

He received the 2019 Humane Legislator award for introducing legislation to ban pet stores from selling inhumanely bred animals and helped organize an event in support of Danbury Animal Welfare Society at a local pub.

During a May 2020 virtual Democratic Party convention, Allie-Brennan was nominated to serve for another term in the Connecticut House of Representatives.

Personal life 
Allie-Brennan is openly gay.

References

Living people
Democratic Party members of the Connecticut House of Representatives
LGBT state legislators in Connecticut
Gay politicians
1991 births
Marymount Manhattan College alumni
People from Bethel, Connecticut
21st-century American politicians
Bethel High School (Connecticut) alumni
Politicians from Queens, New York
American people of Guyanese descent